Hanshou South railway station is a railway station in Hanshou County, Changde, Hunan, China. It is an intermediate stop on the Shimen–Changsha railway.

The station opened in 1997. On 1 April 2022, the name of the station was changed from Hanshou to Hanshou South. The new station on the currently under construction Changde–Yiyang–Changsha high-speed railway simultaneously had its name changed from Hanshou South to Hanshou.

See also
Hanshou railway station, a station on Changde–Yiyang–Changsha HSR

References 

Railway stations in Hunan
Railway stations in China opened in 1997